Aramis Michael Garcia (born January 12, 1993) is an American professional baseball catcher in the Philadelphia Phillies organization. The San Francisco Giants selected Garcia in the second round of the 2014 Major League Baseball draft. He made his Major League Baseball (MLB) debut with the Giants in 2018 and has also played for the Oakland Athletics and Cincinnati Reds.

Amateur career
Garcia attended Pembroke Pines Charter High School in Pembroke Pines, Florida. The St. Louis Cardinals selected him in the 20th round of the 2011 Major League Baseball draft, but he did not sign a contract with them.

He enrolled at Florida International University (FIU) to play college baseball for the FIU Panthers. In 2012 and 2013, he played collegiate summer baseball with the Cotuit Kettleers of the Cape Cod Baseball League. In 2014, Garcia batted .368/.442/.626 and was named the Conference USA Baseball Player of the Year and a semifinalist for the Johnny Bench Award.

Professional career

San Francisco Giants
The San Francisco Giants selected Garcia in the second round, with the 52nd overall selection, of the 2014 Major League Baseball draft. The Giants signed Garcia to a contract with a $1.1 million signing bonus. In his first professional season, he played for both the AZL Giants and the Salem-Keizer Volcanoes, posting a combined .225 batting average with two home runs and 15 RBIs. He began the 2015 season with the Augusta GreenJackets of the Class A South Atlantic League, where he was named a midseason All-Star. He received a midseason promotion to the San Jose Giants of the Class A-Advanced California League and finished the year there; in 103 total games between the two teams, he batted .264/.342/.431 with 15 home runs and 66 RBIs.

Garcia received an invitation to spring training in 2016 as a non-roster player. He missed two months of the 2016 season due to multiple facial fractures he suffered during a May 22 game. When he returned, he played for San Jose where he batted .257/323/340 with two home runs and 20 RBIs in 41 games. In 2017, he played for both San Jose and the Richmond Flying Squirrels of the Class AA Eastern League, posting a combined .274 batting average with 17 home runs and 73 RBIs along with an .808 OPS in 103 games between the two games. The Giants added him to their 40-man roster after the 2017 season.

In 2018, Garcia played 80 games for Richmond, and then was promoted to the Sacramento River Cats of the Class AAA Pacific Coast League. With Buster Posey undergoing season-ending surgery, the Giants promoted Garcia to the major leagues on August 26. He played his first game on August 31, and hit a home run in his debut.

He played in the 2019 season with Sacramento, batting .271/.343/.488 with 16 home runs and 55 RBIs in 332 at bats. He also played 18 games for the Giants. On November 20, 2020, Garcia was designated for assignment.

Oakland Athletics
On November 25, 2020, the Texas Rangers claimed Garcia off of waivers. On February 6, 2021, the Rangers traded Garcia and Elvis Andrus to the Oakland Athletics in exchange for Khris Davis, Jonah Heim, and Dane Acker. Garcia hit .205/.239/.318 in 32 games for the Athletics before he was designated for assignment on September 20, 2021. Garcia was released by Oakland on September 22.

Cincinnati Reds
On November 29, 2021, Garcia signed a minor league contract with the Cincinnati Reds. On April 4, 2022, it was announced that he had made the 2022 opening day roster. He appeared in 47 games for Cincinnati, slashing .213/.248/.259 with one home run and 4 RBI.

On October 14, 2022, Garcia was claimed off waivers by the Baltimore Orioles. On November 1, Garcia elected free agency.

Philadelphia Phillies
On February 16, 2023, Garcia signed a minor league contract with the Philadelphia Phillies organization.

References

External links

1993 births
Living people
People from Hialeah, Florida
Baseball players from Florida
Major League Baseball catchers
San Francisco Giants players
Oakland Athletics players
Cincinnati Reds players
FIU Panthers baseball players
Cotuit Kettleers players
Arizona League Giants players
Salem-Keizer Volcanoes players
Augusta GreenJackets players
San Jose Giants players
Richmond Flying Squirrels players
Sacramento River Cats players
Toros del Este players
American expatriate baseball players in the Dominican Republic